Park Nam-Yeol (born May 4, 1970) is South Korean former football player who played as midfielder. He currently manager new K League 2 side Cheonan City FC.

He capped 250 games and 40 goals, 24 assists in his career.

Club career 
1993-199? Ilhwa Chunma
1996 Cheonan Ilhwa Chunma
1997-1998 Sangmu - army
1999 Cheonan Ilhwa Chunma
2000-2003 Seongnam Ilhwa Chunma
2004 Suwon Samsung Bluewings

Managerial Career 
2005–2008 Baikyang Middle School
2009–2011 Goyang Daekyo Noonnoppi
2012 South Korea Women's
2013 Seongnam FC (assistant)
2014–2016 Icheon Daekyo WFC
2018 Jeonnam Dragons (assistant) 
2019–20 Gimhae FC
2022– Cheonan City FC

Managerial statistics

Honours

As a player
Team
 K-League 1993 winner with Ilhwa Chunma
 K-League 1994 winner with Ilhwa Chunma
 K-League 1995 winner with Ilhwa Chunma
 Adidas Cup 1995 runner-up with Ilhwa Chunma
 Adidas Cup 2000 runner-up with Seongnam Ilhwa Chunma
 K-League 2001 winner with Seongnam Ilhwa Chunma
 K-League 2002 winner with Seongnam Ilhwa Chunma
 Adidas Cup 2002 winner with Seongnam Ilhwa Chunma
 K-League 2003 winner with Seongnam Ilhwa Chunma

Individual
 Korean FA Cup 1999 MVP with Chunan Ilhwa Chunma

As a coach
 WK-League 2011 winner with Goyang Daekyo Noonnoppi

International goals
Results list South Korea's goal tally first.

External links
 
 National Team Player Record 
 FIFA Player Statistics
 

1970 births
Living people
Association football midfielders
South Korean footballers
South Korea international footballers
Seongnam FC players
Gimcheon Sangmu FC players
Suwon Samsung Bluewings players
K League 1 players
South Korean football managers
Footballers at the 1994 Asian Games
Asian Games competitors for South Korea